Conseil représentatif des institutions juives de France (CRIF) is an umbrella organization of other groups representing the interests of French Jews.

Overview
It is the official French affiliate of the World Jewish Congress (WJC), the world-wide umbrella organization of Jewish communities, and of the European Jewish Congress.

It opposes antisemitism and policies that they perceive to be antisemitic. It generally supports Zionism and the state of Israel, although in 2004 CRIF refuted Israeli Prime Minister Ariel Sharon's characterization of antisemitism in France and his calls for French Jews to emigrate to Israel.

On 20 November 2004, CRIF accused the French government of failing to protect citizens from broadcasts by Hezbollah's al-Manar TV, which includes films that CRIF asserts are antisemitic and incite Muslims to attack Jews. (Reuters-Haaretz) Al-Manar was blocked by the CSA. It has opposed the beatification of Pope Pius XII, stating that a majority of historians disagreed with the position that Pius worked ceaselessly to save Jews.

Presidents of the Council of French Jewish Institutions

References

External links
 CRIF website

Anti-racism in France
Jews and Judaism in France
Jewish political organizations